Takreem America or Takreem USA is a non-profit organization founded in 2019 to honor Arab Americans as individuals and institutions. Every year, Takreem America recognizes those who have contributed to the development of their societies and the improvement of the world in the fields of Young Entrepreneurship, Corporate Leadership, Cultural Excellence, Scientific and Technological Achievement, and Environmental Development and Sustainability.

History

Ricardo Karam  came up with the idea of Takreem in 2004 and officially launched in 2009. In February 2022, Takreem expanded its activities to include the United States and reach out to the Arab diaspora in the two continents of America; to be a launch announcement (Takreem America), The first honoring ceremony was held in Miami, Florida.

Dedicated to recognizing the significant contributions of the Arab diaspora ,Takreem America hosted its 2nd annual weekend in Los Angeles, California. on February 25, 2023 at Millennium Biltmore Hotel.

Activities
Takreem America first get-together took place in Miami, Florida, in February 2022. It consisted of an Awards ceremony, a gala dinner, and a series of talks and panels. The gala dinner aimed to raise funds for Lebanese students living in the USA who had no means of paying university fees due to the liquidity crisis in Lebanon, which in turn led to a decline in the value of the Lebanese pound against the dollar and the difficulty of conducting transactions for the Lebanese with banks.

Takreem America 2023, featured Takreem's Awards Night and TAKminds Forum, both of which served as platforms for important dialogues aimed at fostering community and world improvement.

At the Awards Night, Takreem America celebrated the exceptional achievements of selected laureates for 2023, comprising men and women who have made an outstanding impact in their respective fields.

Gallery

Laureates

References

Arab culture
Organisations based in Lebanon
Lebanese awards
Events in the United States
Arab American